Uljhan (Confusion) is a 1975 Hindi suspense thriller film. Produced by Sudesh Kumar and directed by Raghunath Jhalani, it stars Ashok Kumar, Sanjeev Kumar, Asrani, Farida Jalal, Aruna Irani, Sulakshana Pandit, and Ranjeet. The music is by Kalyanji Anandji. It is a remake of 1959 murder mystery Kangan starring Ashok Kumar and Nirupa Roy with a twist about the identity of the killer.

Uljhan was a suspense thriller revolving around a murder investigation conducted by a police officer (Sanjeev Kumar) who doesn't know that the killer is closer to home. The movie marked the acting debut of singer/actor Sulakshana Pandit.

Cast
Ashok Kumar as Judge Kailash Chandra
Sanjeev Kumar as Anand
Sulakshana Pandit as Karuna
Ranjeet as Brijbhushan 
Asrani as Vikram
Farida Jalal as Kamla
Aruna Irani as Usha
Pinchoo Kapoor as Police Commissioner

Soundtrack
The songs composed by the duo Kalyanji–Anandji were popular in the mid-1970s, especially the title track sung by Kishore Kumar and Lata Mangeshkar.

Kishore also sang a duet with Sulakshana called "Aaj Pyaare Pyaare se Lagte Hain" which was popular. 
Lyrics made by M.G. Hashmat.

External links 
 

1975 films
1970s Hindi-language films
Films scored by Kalyanji Anandji
Remakes of Indian films